George Albert Archie (April 27, 1914 – September 20, 2001) was a Major League Baseball infielder with the Detroit Tigers, Washington Senators and St. Louis Browns spanning three seasons. Archie was predominantly a third baseman, but also played first base. Archie began his career with the Detroit Tigers in 1938, and subsequently played for the Washington Senators (1941) and St. Louis Browns (1941, 1946).

Personal life
Archie served as a corporal in the 65th Infantry Division of the United States Army during World War II. Enlisting in December 1941, he served in Europe.

References

External links

1914 births
2001 deaths
Washington Senators (1901–1960) players
Detroit Tigers players
St. Louis Browns players
Major League Baseball third basemen
Vanderbilt Commodores baseball coaches
Baseball players from Nashville, Tennessee
United States Army personnel of World War II
Pacific Coast League MVP award winners